The CONCACAF–CONMEBOL play-off of the 1999 FIFA Women's World Cup qualification competition was a two-legged home-and-away tie that decided one spot in the final tournament in the United States. The play-off was contested by the runners-up from CONCACAF, Mexico, and the runners-up from CONMEBOL, Argentina.

Qualified teams

Summary
|}

Matches

Mexico won 6–3 on aggregate and qualified for the 1999 FIFA Women's World Cup.

Goalscorers

References

External links
FIFA website

Play-off
Mexico women's national football team matches
FIFA Women's World Cup qualification (CONCACAF–CONMEBOL play-off)
Argentina women's national football team matches
FIFA Women's World Cup qualification (CONCACAF–CONMEBOL play-off)
FIFA Women's World Cup qualification (CONCACAF–CONMEBOL play-off)
FIFA Women's World Cup qualification (CONCACAF–CONMEBOL play-off)
FIFA Women's World Cup qualification (CONCACAF–CONMEBOL play-off)
1998
1998